Randall Szott is an American artist and politician who served in the Vermont House of Representatives from 2019 until 2021.

Biography 
Szott was born in December 1971 in the Space Coast of Florida. He received a bachelor of arts degree in liberal arts from the University of Central Florida, a master of fine arts degree in critical practice from Ohio State University, and a master of arts degree in interdisciplinary art from San Francisco State University.

Szott has delivered lectures about social practice at the San Francisco Museum of Modern Art and the California College of the Arts. In 2018, he was an invited guest of the Harvard Graduate School of Education for a Radcliffe Institute for Advanced Study workshop. He was a founding editor of 127 Prince, the first journal devoted to social practice.

At some point, Szott was a member of the United States Merchant Marine and also worked chef. He is now a public librarian in Weston, Vermont. Szot currently lives in lives in the town of Barnard, Vermont.

A member of the Democratic Party, Szott was elected to the Vermont House of Representatives in 2018, representing the Windsor 4-1 district, which contains the towns of West Hartford, Barnard, Pomfret, and most of Quechee. Szott was elected unopposed. Szott did not run for re-election in 2020.

References

External links

Vermont House of Representatives

Living people
1971 births
Democratic Party members of the Vermont House of Representatives